Adam Józef Aleksander Epler (born 1 December 1891 in Lwów, Austrian Galicia; died 24 October 1965 in London) was a Colonel of Artillery of the Polish Army, posthumously promoted to Generał brygady. Epler had a wife Zofia (née Murczyńska) and son Zbigniew (1919 - 2010).

Biography
Epler was raised in an affluent family: his father Edward was a railroad engineer and deputy mayor of the city of Lwów. In 1909, he graduated from Classical Gymnasium in Chyrów, and began studies at Lwów University. In 1912, Epler was drafted into the Austro-Hungarian Army, serving at XI Artillery Brigade, and graduating from School of Reserve Officers. On 1 May 1915 he was promoted to Subcolonel (podporucznik). During World War I, he fought on the Italian Front, and in 1918, he completed artillery course for officers, which took place at Trento.

After the collapse of Austria-Hungary, Epler returned to former Austrian Galicia and joined the newly created Polish Army. In mid-November 1918, he was named commandant of an artillery battery of 1st Kraków Field Artillery Regiment. Together with the regiment, he fought in the Polish–Ukrainian War and Polish–Soviet War. In 1920, he was transferred to 3rd Legion Field Artillery Regiment.

After the Polish–Soviet War, Epler completed a military training course in Toruń, and was promoted to major. In 1922–1929, he served as artillery officer in the garrison of Zamość, where 3rd Legions Infantry Division was stationed. He was highly praised by General Stanisław Kwaśniewski, who at that time commanded the 3rd Division.

On 4 December 1929 Epler was named commandant of 28th Field Artillery Regiment, which was stationed in Zajezierze near Dęblin. He remained there until October 1935, and during his service at Zajezierze, he was popular among soldiers due to his organizational abilities. From October 1935 until the Invasion of Poland, Epler served in 20th Infantry Division in Baranowicze.

In early September 1939, Epler took command of Reserve Center of 20th Infantry at Słonim. In a matter of a few days, he managed to create the so-called Kobryń Group, with the strength of a regular infantry division. His unit, renamed into 60th Infantry Division, joined Independent Operational Group Polesie (General Franciszek Kleeberg), and fought in the final battles of the September Campaign, including Battle of Kock (1939).

On 6 October 1939 Epler was taken prisoner by the Germans, who allowed him to keep his officer's sabre. He was taken to a temporary camp at Dęblin, and then transferred to Radom. With help of local boy scouts, Epler managed to escape, and fled to Kraków, where he joined conspiratorial Organization of White Eagle, using the pseudonym Kobylański. To escape arrest, he decided to flee to Hungary. In December 1940 he reached Egypt, and after the war settled in London, where he died on 24 October 1965.

Epler wrote the book Last Polish soldier of the 1939 campaign. It was published first in 1942 in Tel Aviv, and reprinted in Poland in 1989. On 28 October 1994 President Lech Wałęsa posthumously promoted him to Generał brygady.

Awards 
 Knight's Cross of the Virtuti Militari
 Silver Cross of the Virtuti Militari
 Gold Cross of the Virtuti Militari
 Officer's Cross of the Order of Polonia Restituta
 Cross of Valour (Poland) (four times)
 Gold Cross of Merit (Poland) (on 10 November 1938)

See also 
 List of Polish generals

References

Sources 
 Tadeusz Jurga: Obrona Polski 1939. Warszawa: Instytut Wydawniczy PAX, 1990, s. 765. .

1891 births
1965 deaths
Military personnel from Lviv
People from the Kingdom of Galicia and Lodomeria
Polish emigrants to the United Kingdom
Polish generals
Epler
Polish people of World War I
Polish people of the Polish–Ukrainian War
Polish people of the Polish–Soviet War
Polish military personnel of World War II
Knights of the Virtuti Militari
Recipients of the Gold Cross of the Virtuti Militari
Recipients of the Silver Cross of the Virtuti Militari
Officers of the Order of Polonia Restituta
Recipients of the Cross of Valour (Poland)
Recipients of the Gold Cross of Merit (Poland)